Cymindis carnica is a species of ground beetle in the subfamily Harpalinae. It was described by J. Muller in 1924.

References

carnica
Beetles described in 1924